Sincerely is the first album released by Melody. It was released on January 21, 2004, by Toy's Factory.

Track listing

References 

Melody (Japanese singer) albums
2004 albums
Japanese-language albums